Ouray National Wildlife Refuge (also called Ouray National Waterfowl Refuge) is a wildlife refuge in central Uintah County, Utah in the northeastern part of the state.

A portion of the refuge is leased from the Uintah and Ouray Indian Reservation. The refuge was created for the use of both local and migratory birds, and with funds provided by the sale of Federal Duck Stamps.

The site of the refuge also holds the Ouray National Fish Hatchery, which was established in 1996 to help hatch razorback suckers, humpback chubs, Colorado pikeminnows and Bonytail chubs.

References

External links
 
 
 USFWS Ouray National Wildlife Refuge Page
 Gorp.com Travel Info

National Wildlife Refuges in Utah
Green River (Colorado River tributary)
Protected areas of Uintah County, Utah
Protected areas on the Colorado River
Protected areas established in 1960
1960 establishments in Utah